Tirhut is a rural municipality in Saptari District in the Sagarmatha Zone of south-eastern Nepal. At the time of the 2017 Nepal census it had a population of 22,090 people living in 8921 individual households.

References 

Populated places in Saptari District
Rural municipalities of Nepal established in 2017
Rural municipalities in Madhesh Province